Chawkbazar is a thana under the Chattogram District in Chattogram Division, Bangladesh. It is one of the busiest places of Chattogram.

Education 
Many notable educational institutions are situated in this area such as Chittagong College, Government Hazi Mohammad Mohshin College, Chittagong Government High School, Hazi Muhammad Mohsin High School, Chittagong Medical College, Chittagong Science College, several campuses of International Islamic University Chittagong etc.

See also 
 Upazilas of Bangladesh
 Districts of Bangladesh
 Divisions of Bangladesh

References 

Geography of Chittagong